Orthocindela is a genus of beetles in the family Cicindelidae, containing the following species:

 Orthocindela angustecincta Rivalier, 1972
 Orthocindela heterida (Brouerius van Nidek, 1960)

References

Cicindelidae